Theodorus Washington Brevard (September 24, 1804 – 1877) was a Florida settler who served as Florida Comptroller for nearly ten years from April 3, 1851, to November 27, 1854, and from January 24, 1855, to December 14, 1860. He is the namesake of Brevard County, Florida.  He was born in North Carolina in 1804.

He was the son of Alexander Brevard (b. 1755), an officer in the Continental Army, and Rebecca Davidson. He married Caroline Elizabeth Mays and was the father of Theodore W. Brevard, Jr.

He settled in Tallahassee, Florida in 1847. After his death he was buried in his home town of Lincoln County, North Carolina.

References 

1804 births
1877 deaths
Florida lawyers
Florida Comptrollers
Florida pioneers
History of Brevard County, Florida
History of Florida
People from Lincolnton, North Carolina
People from Tallahassee, Florida
19th-century American politicians
19th-century American lawyers